Saint-Didier-sur-Chalaronne (literally Saint-Didier on Chalaronne) is a commune in the Ain department in eastern France.

Geography
The Chalaronne flows westward through the southern part of the commune, then flows into the Saône, which forms part of the commune's southwestern border.

Population

See also
Communes of the Ain department

References

External links

 La Dombes and Saint-Didier-sur-Chalaronne

Communes of Ain
Ain communes articles needing translation from French Wikipedia